Manuchar Tskhadaia (born March 19, 1985) is a male wrestler from Georgia.

He won the bronze medal at the 2012 Summer Olympics in the men's Greco-Roman 66 kg category.

References

External links
 

Living people
1985 births
Male sport wrestlers from Georgia (country)
Wrestlers at the 2012 Summer Olympics
Olympic bronze medalists for Georgia (country)
Olympic medalists in wrestling
Olympic wrestlers of Georgia (country)
Medalists at the 2012 Summer Olympics
World Wrestling Championships medalists
European Wrestling Championships medalists